Babayevsky (masculine), Babayevskaya (feminine), or Babayevskoye (neuter) may refer to:
Babayevsky District, a district of Vologda Oblast, Russia
Babayevsky (company), Russian confectionery manufacturer
Babayevskaya, a rural locality (village) in Kirov Oblast, Russia